Harry Datyner (La Chaux-de-Fonds, 4 February 1923 – Fribourg, 23 March 1992)  was a Swiss classical pianist who taught for many years at the Geneva Conservatory.

A student of both Marguerite Long and Edwin Fischer, he won the First Prize by unanimity at the Geneva International Music Competition in 1944, at the age of 21, after which he performed extensively under conductors such as Ernest Ansermet, Georges Prêtre, Charles Dutoit, Wolfgang Sawallisch,  Eleazar de Carvalho, Pierre Dervaux, Charles Groves, Lovro von Matačić,  and with orchestras such as the Orchestre de la Suisse Romande, London Philharmonic Orchestra, Montreal Symphony Orchestra, Monte-Carlo Philharmonic Orchestra and National Orchestra of Belgium.

He also studied with Émile-Robert Blanchet. In 1992, at the age of 69, he died in a car accident.

Swiss classical pianists
1923 births
1992 deaths
20th-century classical pianists
Road incident deaths in Switzerland
Jewish classical pianists